Guccio is an Italian given name and surname. People with those names include:

Given name
 Guccio Gucci (1881-1953) founder of the House of Gucci luxury fashion brand
 Guccio di Mannaia, 13th century Italian goldsmith
 Guccio de Medici, 14th century member of the Medici family, see Medici family tree
 Guccio del Sero, 14th century Italian painter

Surname
 Giannino di Guccio, 14th century man who claimed to be the adult version of the deceased child king John I the Posthumous of France
 Mario Guccio (1953-2018) lead vocalist of Belgian rock band Machiavel
 Poggio di Guccio, 15th century Italian soldier

See also
 Gucio Czartoryski (1858-1893) beatified Salesian and Polish noble
 AMZ Dzik aka "Gucio", armoured personnel carrier
 Gucci (disambiguation)